Lauren-Ashley Redmond (born November 15, 1991), more commonly known as Lauren-Ashley, is a country singer/songwriter based in Nashville, TN. Lauren-Ashley was raised in Griffin, Georgia, where she attended Flint River Academy for high school and began singing. She attended Georgia Southern University for one year (2010–2011), where she won GSU Idol and shortly after began recording her first EP with producer Trey Roth of Black Cat Studio.

Lauren-Ashley currently resides in Nashville, TN and has been performing often in the Southeastern United States and recording. Notable performances include opening for Ronnie Milsap, opening for Luke Bryan, and performing at the Country Music Hall of Fame in Nashville. She was awarded Georgia Country Female Artist of the Year in November 2011 by voters.

Biography
Lauren-Ashley Redmond was born November 15, 1991 in Griffin, GA. Ever since her early years in Griffin, music was a part of Lauren-Ashley's life. Family members of Lauren-Ashley recall her singing since she could talk. As a child, she performed in church and school talent shows. However, Lauren-Ashley's involvement in music became more serious in high school. At Flint River Academy, she participated in cheerleading and softball. Her musical activities in high school were Literary Team and All-Select Chorus. Her senior year of high school, she won second place in a state talent competition. 
After graduating from Flint River Academy, Lauren-Ashley attended Georgia Southern University for the 2010–2011 academic year. In October 2010, Lauren-Ashley represented her sorority, Alpha Delta Pi, in the GSU Idol Competition, which is an American Idol-based singing competition for Georgia Southern University students. After three rounds of performances, Lauren-Ashley was named the winner of the GSU competition.
Soon after her GSU Idol win, Lauren-Ashley began working with producer Trey Roth of Black Cat Studio, where an EP was being made. Since the release of the EP, Lauren-Ashley has been promoting her EP and performing those songs as well as covers throughout the Southeastern USA.

Artistry

Musical style and influences
Lauren-Ashley's musical influences include Miranda Lambert, Stevie Nicks, Jason Aldean, and Eric Church. Also influenced by Carrie Underwood, her work is characterized by country vocals and music with a rock edge. As far as song-writing, all of Lauren-Ashley's EP tracks are originals. In the same manner of artists such as Johnny Cash and Kris Kristofferson, Lauren-Ashley writes songs about whatever is happening in life at the moment.

Stage performances and public image
In Lauren-Ashley's career thus far, she has received mostly positive reception. Audiences seem to enjoy the amount of energy in her performances. Bobby Wheaton believes what sets her apart is her song-writing content choices and her instincts, but does not know whether she will "reach the country radio rotation." Based on her CD sales and nomination for Georgia Country Female Artist of the Year, Shelia Marshall calls her a local and state-wide favorite. Georgia-Country.com gave her EP a positive review, saying about the product that she "displays a great range of vocal talent and creates product that is fun and easy to listen to. While she is definitely influenced by the likes of Carrie [Underwood] and Miranda [Lambert], she also sets herself apart."

Awards
Lauren-Ashley's career was kickstarted by her win of Georgia Southern University's GSU Idol competition in 2010. Since then, she has also won a national songwriting competition, Wake Up Nashville—and Dream Big. Her song, "Cold November" placed first, and her song "Drive" placed in the top ten. Most recently, Lauren-Ashley won 2011 Georgia Country Female Artist of the Year.

Performances

Style
Lauren-Ashley performs both her original tracks as well as covers, including Heidi Newfield's "Johnny and June," as well as Carrie Underwood's "Last Name". The atmosphere is high-energy from the rock edge brought on to the country songs by her vocals as well as the band.

Significant performances

Ronnie Milsap, opener (2011)
Country Music Hall of Fame (2011)
Luke Bryan, opener (2011)

Discography
Lauren-Ashley (2011)

Personnel

Songwriting
All of Lauren-Ashley's songs are written by: 
Lauren Ashley Redmond
Haley Redmond
Jeff Chandler
Eryn Erickson
Trey Roth
Doug Wick

Vocals
Lauren Ashley Redmond (lead vocals, backing vocals)
James David Carter (backing vocals)

Instrumentation
Jason Hoad (acoustic guitar)
Trey Roth (piano, organ, programming, percussion, acoustic guitar, electric guitar)
Josh Fisher (drums)
Tim Gibson (bass)
John Murdy (electric guitar, pads)
Chris Carmichael (strings)
Gaylon Matthews (steel guitar)

References

External links
 Official Website

Living people
1991 births
People from Griffin, Georgia
21st-century American singers
Singer-songwriters from Georgia (U.S. state)